Agonomalus is a genus of poachers native to the Pacific Ocean.

Species
There are currently three recognized species in this genus:
 Agonomalus jordani D. S. Jordan & Starks, 1904
 Agonomalus mozinoi Wilimovsky & D. E. Wilson, 1979 (Kelp poacher)
 Agonomalus proboscidalis (Valenciennes, 1858)

References

Hypsagoninae
 
Taxa named by Alphonse Guichenot